Abdal Samad (also Romanized as ʿAbdāl Şamad) is a village in Kohanabad Rural District, Kohanabad District, Aradan County, Semnan Province, Iran. At the 2006 census, it was noted but its population was not reported.

References 

Populated places in Aradan County